Franz Twaroch (16 November 1892 – 28 October 1933) was an Austrian footballer. He played in two matches for the Austria national football team in 1913.

References

External links
 

1892 births
1933 deaths
Austrian footballers
Austria international footballers
Place of birth missing
Association footballers not categorized by position